Gazeta Współczesna is a daily newspaper in the city of Białystok, Poland. It is also a daily newspaper in the Podlasie region. The English translation is "The Modern Newspaper". There are two other newspapers in the city of Białystok and they are called Kurier Poranny and Teraz Białystok.It was founded in 1951.

Publications established in 1951
Daily newspapers published in Poland
Mass media in Białystok